Arny may refer to:

Given name
 Arny Freeman (1908–1986), American actor 
 Arny Freytag (born 1950), American photographer 
 Arny Karl (1940–2000), American artist
 Arny Ross (born 1991), Filipino actress and model

Surname
 Mary Travis Arny (1909–1997) American author
 William Frederick Milton Arny (1813–1881), United States Indian agent

See also
 Arney (disambiguation) 
 Arnie (disambiguation) 
 Arnie, a given name